The Jakarta tram system was a transport system in Jakarta, Indonesia. Its first-generation tram network first operated as a horse tram system, and was eventually converted to electric trams in the early twentieth century.

History

Dutch era
The first horse tram in Batavia was operated by Bataviasche Tramweg Maatschappij (BTM, Batavia Tramways Company). The horse tram line was inaugurated on 20 April 1869, long before trams existed in the Netherlands- using a gauge width of 1,188 mm (3 ft 10 25⁄32 in), connecting Batavia Old Town with Weltevreden. At the time the tram, pulled by 3-4 horses, could accommodate up to 40 passengers. In April 1869 an estimated 1,500 passengers had been served by the system and in September 1869 it was increased to 7,000 passengers.

As a result of horse trams operational problems experienced by the BTM, in 1880 the operation was handled temporarily by Firma Dummler & Co. Two years later, on 19 September 1881 Bataviasche Tramweg Maatschappij officially changed its name into Nederlands-Indische Tramweg Maatschappij (NITM, Netherlands Indies Tramways Company) and took over Batavia trams operation previously handled by Firma Dummler & Co. Under NITM, there was a gradual overhaul of its fleet and infrastructure, which the replacement of horse with steam locomotives produced by Hohenzollern Locomotive Works. The first locomotive was purchased for ƒ8,800 and the fleet replacement process was completed in 1884. The horse tram service was closed from 12 June 1882. NITM services reopened on 1 July 1883 with the inauguration of the steam tram service as well as the new Batavia Old Town–Harmonie line.

Four years after the operation of the Batavia Old Town–Harmoni steam tram line, electric trams was introduced under the operation of the Batavia Elektrische Tram Maatschappij (BETM, Batavia Electric Tram Company), making it a competitor to the NITM's steam tram. BETM began operation since the inauguration of Batavia Old Town–Ragunan Zoo line on 10 April 1899 which was extended to Tanah Abang Station in November 1899, but unfortunately the extension was closed in 1904. In 1900 BETM extended its tram network, reaching Jembatan Merah, Tanah Tinggi, and Gunung Sahari areas by crossing Ciliwung River. With the increasing number of years, BETM continued to expand its tram network until 1920, it marked with unhealthy competition between BETM and NITM. The competition caused ticket prices became too expensive that Batavia city government demanded NITM to upgrade its fleet to become electric-powered, but was refused by NITM itself.

As a result of the competition, the two began to impose transit tickets and special schedules during rush hour. On 31 July 1930 NITM and BTM were merged to form Bataviasche Verkeers Maatschappij (BVM, Batavia Transport Company). The merger combines 1 steam tram line, 2 trolleybus lines, and 7 bus routes operated by both NITM and BETM.

Under BVM, the tramways underwent significant changes. In former NITM routes, the electrification program was carried out from April 1933 to 1934. The electrification made the travel time from Batavia Old City to Jatinegara cut by 10 minutes. BVM experienced its peak in 1934, where it operating 5 electric tram lines with a total length of 41 kilometers.

The decline of the Batavia (Jakarta) tram began in 1935. As a result of Great Depression, BVM had financial problems, which its popularity was threatened by the emergence of other modes such as bemo and oplet. As a result of this financial constraint, the BVM bus service was closed and the company will only focus on the trolleybus service. The BVM bus service only reopened in 1941.

Post-Dutch era
In March 1942, the Dutch East Indies enter the Japanese occupation. The trams service managed by the BVM was taken over by the Japanese army and changed its name to the Nippon Batavia Tram Army. Then in June 1942 it was changed to Seibu Rikuyo Batavia Shiden, and then, Jakaruta Shiden (ジャカルタ市電, Jakarta Trams). Under the control of Jakaruta Shiden the Jakarta tram underwent overhaul, including abolishing the class system, dismissing BVM workers who were Dutch citizens, applying Japanese symbols on tram bodies, and doubling tracks on Gunung Sahari–Pal Putih line.

After Indonesian independence, Indonesians took over the Jakaruta Shiden system on 13 October 1945, and changed its name to the Djakarta-Kota Tram which in 1957 was nationalized as Pengangkutan Penumpang Djakarta (PPD, Djakarta Passenger Transport). Although it was taken over, PPD only operated the tram for some years and was abolished because it was deemed unsuitable for urban spatial planning.

Rolling stock
The list provide only steam-tram rolling stock of Batavia until the year 1924. The list is sorted by its year.

Gallery

See also
 Transport in Jakarta
 Trams in Surabaya, another former tram system in Indonesia

References

Cited works

 

 
 

Transport in Jakarta
1869 establishments in the Dutch East Indies
Jakarta
Tram transport in Indonesia